Emanuele Gatto (born 11 August 1994) is an Italian professional footballer who plays as a midfielder for  club Ancona-Matelica.

Club career

Torino
Born in Turin, Piedmont, Gatto started his career at hometown club Torino. He was called up to the first team on two occasions between 2011 and 2013, without ever debuting. In 2012–13, he was the captain of the Primavera side.

Lumezzane
On 16 July 2013 Gatto was sold to Lega Pro Prima Divisione club Lumezzane in co-ownership deal. The club finished as the 14th (out of 16 teams) in Group A of 2013–14 season. However the club was not relegated, as the prime and second divisions were merged into one division – Lega Pro Divisione Unica.

Siena
On 20 June 2014 Torino bought back Gatto, but included him in the transfer of Marcelo Larrondo to Torino from Siena outright. However, on 15 July 2014 Siena announced that the club failed to register in 2014–15 Serie B, thus the club went into liquidation.

Chievo
On 8 August 2014 Gatto was signed by Serie A club Chievo. On 11 August 2014 he returned to Lumezzane. On 28 July 2015 he was signed by Cuneo in another loan. On 27 July 2016 he was signed by Santarcangelo in another loan.

In 2017–18 season, both Emanuele Gatto and Massimiliano Gatto were remained in Verona for the first team of Chievo.

Alessandria 
On 5 January 2018 Chievo announced that Gatto was sold to Alessandria.

Südtirol 
On 14 July 2019, he signed a 2-year contract with 1-year extension option with Südtirol.

U.S. Ancona
On 8 July 2022, Gatto signed a two-year deal with Ancona-Matelica.

International career 
Gatto made his U19 national debut on 23 August 2012, against Croatia.

References

External links
 AIC profile (data by football.it) 
 

1994 births
Living people
Footballers from Turin
Italian footballers
Association football midfielders
Serie C players
Torino F.C. players
F.C. Lumezzane V.G.Z. A.S.D. players
A.C.N. Siena 1904 players
A.C. ChievoVerona players
A.C. Cuneo 1905 players
Santarcangelo Calcio players
U.S. Alessandria Calcio 1912 players
F.C. Südtirol players
Ancona-Matelica players
Italy youth international footballers